Laboratory of Solid State Microstructure (LSSMS) is located in Nanjing University, China. It is a key laboratory in physics, associated with such faculties as schools of physics and electronics and department of materials of engineering school at Nanjing University.

The Laboratory has accomplished many achievements and enjoys international fame. Nature magazine listed it as one of the two best research groups approaching/with world-class standards in East Asia apart from Japan. The Institute for Scientific Information listed it as the No. 1 laboratory in China as published in Science magazine.

History
In 1984, Nanjing University Institute of Solid State Physics was changed to State Key Laboratory of Solid State Microstructures of Nanjing University, which was mainly associated with the Department of Physics of Nanjing University at the time.
Nanjing National Laboratory of Microstructures, which mainly based upon LSSMS and LCC (State Key Laboratory of Coordination Chemistry) at Nanjing University, was formally started to establish in 2006, with estimated investment of RMB 300 million, and before that, in 2004, NU received endowment of RMB 50 million from Cyrus Tang Foundation for its establishment, and the National Microstructures Laboratory Building - Cyrus Tang Building, was completed in 2007.

Research areas
Physics of microstructured dielectric materials
Nano-structured materials and physics
Aggregations and pattern formation under non-equilibrium conditions
Dynamics of microstructural assembly and modulation
Strong correlation effect in solids
Phase transitions
Other related microstructural physics in solids

Notable scientists
Feng Duan
Ming Naiben

Notes 

Nanjing University
Physics laboratories
Research institutes in China
Laboratories in China